Scott Joseph Laurer (born 1965) is a retired United States Navy Captain and American lawyer who serves as a judge of the United States Court of Appeals for Veterans Claims.

Early life 
Born as the third of seven children, Scott Laurer grew up in the historical town of Woodbury, N.J. His father served in the Navy during the Korean War era, and his uncle served in the Army in Vietnam. His maternal grandfather worked as a claims investigator for the Yellow Cab company in Philadelphia. He worked with attorneys and talked about his work with the family, sparking Laurer's interest in the field. When he completed a survey in high school to identify his career interests, the top profession recommended for him was an attorney.

Education 

As a college student at Rutgers University-New Brunswick, Laurer majored in political science. He spoke to a Navy recruiter, asking if it would be possible to attend law school part time while serving in the Navy. The recruiter advised that in the Navy, it was unlikely that he would be stationed in one location long enough to complete a law degree. Judge Laurer’s first goal was to become a lawyer, so he first pursued law school instead.

While at Temple University School of Law, he learned for the first time that a person could be an attorney in the Navy. One day, he saw people in military uniforms in the student lounge, who he later learned were judge advocates. In an era before the internet, even the Navy recruiter he spoke to knew little about the Navy Judge Advocate General’s Corps.

Later, Laurer earned his Bachelor of Arts from Rutgers University, his Juris Doctor from the Temple University Beasley School of Law, and his Master of Laws in International and Comparative Law from the George Washington University Law School.

Legal career 

Laurer served in the United States Navy as Special Counsel to the Chief of Naval Operations and as a Commanding Officer in the United States Region Legal Service Office for Europe, Africa, and Southwest Asia. Before becoming a judge, he was Deputy Legal Advisor at the National Security Council.

Federal judicial service 

On August 28, 2019, President Trump announced his intent to nominate Laurer to serve as a judge of the United States Court of Appeals for Veterans Claims. On September 19, 2019, his nomination was sent to the Senate. President Trump nominated Laurer to the seat vacated by Judge Mary J. Schoelen when her term expired on December 20, 2019. On November 6, 2019, a hearing on his nomination was held before the Committee on Veterans' Affairs.  Two days later, Captain Laurer retired from the U.S. Navy after serving nearly 30 years on active duty with the U.S. Navy JAG Corps. On January 3, 2020, his nomination was returned to the President under Rule XXXI, Paragraph 6 of the United States Senate. On January 9, 2020, he was renominated to the same seat. On July 23, 2020, the United States Senate confirmed his nomination by voice vote. He received his judicial commission in August 2020.

References

External links 

1965 births
Living people
20th-century American lawyers
21st-century American lawyers
21st-century American judges
George Washington University Law School alumni
United States Navy Judge Advocate General's Corps
Judges of the United States Court of Appeals for Veterans Claims
Rutgers University alumni
Temple University Beasley School of Law alumni
Trump administration personnel
United States Article I federal judges appointed by Donald Trump
United States National Security Council staffers
United States Navy officers
Virginia lawyers